Moshe Shahal (born 20 May 1934) is a former Israeli politician.

Biography
Born in Baghdad in Iraq, Shahal made aliyah in 1950. He studied economics and political science at the University of Haifa, before graduating with a law degree from Tel Aviv University.

He began his political career when elected to the Haifa Labor Council in 1964, a position he retained until 1971. Between 1964 and 1969, he was also a member of Haifa City Council. For the 1969 Knesset elections he was placed 57th on the Alignment's list, but missed out when the alliance won only 56 seats. Nevertheless, Shahal entered the Knesset on 1 September 1971 as a replacement for the deceased Mordechai Ofer.

He was re-elected in 1974, 1977, 1981, and between 1981 and 1984, served as a Deputy Speaker of the Knesset. After a fourth re-election in 1984, he was appointed Minister of Energy & Infrastructure. He was re-appointed to the post following the 1988 elections, serving until the Alignment pulled out of the coalition government in 1990.

Following Labour's victory in the 1992 elections, Shahal was appointed to two posts in the cabinet; Minister of Communications and Minister of Police. He held the Communications portfolio until 7 June 1993, when he was replaced by Shulamit Aloni. However, he regained the Energy and Construction post at the same time, though he gave it up in January 1995, when Gonen Segev (a new addition to Yitzhak Rabin's government) replaced him. Shahal retained the Police Ministry following Rabin's assassination, when it was renamed the Ministry of Public Security.

Although he retained his seat in the 1996 elections and Labour remained the largest party, Benjamin Netanyahu's Likud formed the government, and Shahal lost his place in the cabinet. He resigned from the Knesset on 20 March 1998 and was replaced by Rafik Haj Yahia.

Whilst serving as an MK, Shahal was a permanent observer to the Council of Europe (1974–76) and a permanent representative to the Inter-Parliamentary Union (1976–84). Outside the Knesset, he also served as a chairman of the Israel Consumer's Council.

External links
 
Moshe Shahal Israel Ministry of Foreign Affairs

1934 births
Living people
Alignment (Israel) politicians
City councillors of Haifa
Deputy Speakers of the Knesset
Iraqi emigrants to Israel
Iraqi Jews
Israeli Jews
Israeli Labor Party politicians
Israeli people of Iraqi-Jewish descent
Jewish Israeli politicians
Members of the 7th Knesset (1969–1974)
Members of the 8th Knesset (1974–1977)
Members of the 9th Knesset (1977–1981)
Members of the 10th Knesset (1981–1984)
Members of the 11th Knesset (1984–1988)
Members of the 12th Knesset (1988–1992)
Members of the 13th Knesset (1992–1996)
Members of the 14th Knesset (1996–1999)
Ministers of Communications of Israel
Ministers of Public Security of Israel
Politicians from Baghdad
Tel Aviv University alumni
University of Haifa alumni